Göran Söllscher (born 31 December 1955) is a Swedish award-winning virtuoso classical guitarist known for his broad range of musical interpretations, ranging from Bach to the Beatles. Söllscher's international career began during his years of education at the Royal Conservatory of Copenhagen in Copenhagen, Denmark when at the age of 23, he won the Concours International de Guitare in Paris, 1978. He was signed by German record label Deutsche Grammophon, the largest label featuring classical guitarists. As of 2005, Söllscher had released 19 records, which altogether have sold over a million copies.

Early life
Söllscher was born in Växjö, on the south-east Swedish mainland, and grew up in Kalmar. He started playing a musical instrument from the age of seven.

Career
Söllscher has regularly played with most Scandinavian orchestras, and has toured North America, Europe, Japan and China. He has played with the Camerata Bern, the New Japan Philharmonic, the English Chamber Orchestra, the Royal Philharmonic Orchestra and the Chamber Orchestra of Europe, and for conductors including Claudio Abbado, Alexander Gibson and Esa-Pekka Salonen. In 1991 Söllscher participated in an international guitar festival honoring Joaquin Rodrigo, and later joined the Malmö Conservatory faculty. He has been called the "grand old man of guitarists". Söllscher is known for playing lute music by Baroque composers, such as Weiss and J.S. Bach, on a custom-made eleven-string alto guitar. He is also a professor of guitar at Lund University, and his students include Georg Gulyás and Mattias Schulstad.

Personal life
Today, Söllscher lives in Vitemölla, a small village on Österlen on the east coast of Skåne, not far from Kivik, where the annual Kivik's market takes place. He has a wife, Kerstin Söllscher, and two children, Anna, who is a flautist and singer,  and Johan, who is a guitarist. They often perform as a trio, called "Trio Söllscher".

References

External links
 Interview in Swedish 
 Göran Söllscher on Spotify
 Deutsche Grammophon — Discography
 Deutsche Grammophon — Biography
 Deutsche Grammophon — Press quotes

1955 births
Living people
Swedish classical guitarists